Jonathan Everett Sargent (October 23, 1816 – January 6, 1890) was an American lawyer and politician who served as the Speaker of the New Hampshire House of Representatives, as the President of the New Hampshire Senate and as the chief justice of the New Hampshire Superior Court of Judicature.

Early life
Sargent was born in New London, New Hampshire on October 23, 1816.

Family 
Sargent's father was Ebenezer Sargent (1768 - 1859), his mother was Prudence Chase (1774 - 1858).

Sargent had 5 children. Marie Louise Sargent (1856 - 1894), Annie Lawrie Sargent (1862 - 1865), George Lincoln Sargent (1863 - 1894) and John Jones Sargent (Unknown - 1870).

Education
Sargent graduated from Dartmouth College receiving his A.B. in 1840, and his A.M. in 1843

Sargent was appointed as the Chief Justice March 17, 1873, his term ended when the New Hampshire Superior Court of Judicature was abolished on August 17, 1874.

Notes

1821 births
1890 deaths
Mayors of Concord, New Hampshire
Republican Party members of the New Hampshire House of Representatives
Dartmouth College alumni
Speakers of the New Hampshire House of Representatives
Republican Party New Hampshire state senators
Chief Justices of the New Hampshire Supreme Court
Presidents of the New Hampshire Senate
People from New London, New Hampshire
19th-century American politicians
19th-century American judges